City Academy may refer to:
 Academy (English school), a type of school
 City Academy, London, a performing arts school
 The City Academy Bristol, England
 City Academy Norwich, England
 City Academy High School, in St. Paul, Minnesota